Philipp Ochs (born 17 April 1997) is a German footballer who plays as a winger for  club SV Sandhausen.

Club career
Ochs joined TSG 1899 Hoffenheim's first team in 2015, coming from the U19 side. He made his Bundesliga debut on 15 August 2015 against Bayer 04 Leverkusen replacing Eugen Polanski after 82 minutes in a 2–1 away defeat.

On 31 January 2020, Ochs joined Hannover 96 on deal lasting until 2022.

Ahead of the 2022–23 season, Ochs transferred to SV Sandhausen.

Club career statistics

International career
Ochs is a youth international for Germany for every level from under 15 to under 21, scoring in every level.

Honours
Individual
 Fritz Walter Medal U19 Silver: 2016

References

1997 births
Living people
People from Wertheim am Main
Sportspeople from Stuttgart (region)
Association football wingers
German footballers
Germany youth international footballers
Footballers from Baden-Württemberg
Bundesliga players
2. Bundesliga players
Regionalliga players
Danish Superliga players
TSG 1899 Hoffenheim II players
TSG 1899 Hoffenheim players
VfL Bochum players
AaB Fodbold players
Hannover 96 players
SV Sandhausen players
Germany under-21 international footballers